Cássio Albuquerque dos Anjos (born 12 August 1980), known simply as Cássio, is a Brazilian professional footballer who plays as a goalkeeper for Portuguese club F.C. Felgueiras 1932.

Club career

Brazil
During most of his career in his homeland, Rio de Janeiro-born Cássio played mostly for modest clubs. He started out at Olaria Atlético Clube in 2001 and moved to Bangu Atlético Clube the following year, where he appeared in the 2002 edition of the Campeonato Carioca as the first-team regulars were playing in the Torneio Rio – São Paulo.

Cássio returned to Olaria in 2003, after a short stint at America Football Club. In 2004, he signed with Club de Regatas Vasco da Gama and was immediately loaned back to Olaria for that year's Carioca.

Cássio only became a regular starter in the 2006 season, playing 35 Série A games to help his team to sixth place. In December 2007, following the arrivals of Tiago and Ricardo, he terminated his contract.

On 11 January 2008, Cássio was presented at Macaé Esporte Futebol Clube, whom he had previously represented. He left the club on 7 April, after featuring regularly.

Portugal
In 2008, Cássio moved to Portugal and joined F.C. Paços de Ferreira, being first choice for most of his spell with the Primeira Liga side. He was also the starter during the 2010–11 Taça da Liga, in which his team lost in the final against S.L. Benfica.

Cássio did not miss a minute of action in 2012–13, as Paços finished a best-ever third and qualified for the UEFA Champions League for the first time in its history. He only conceded 29 goals during the campaign.

After leaving the Estádio da Mata Real, Cássio continued to play in the Portuguese top division, for F.C. Arouca and later Rio Ave F.C. and starting in four seasons out of five.

Saudi Arabia
On 9 June 2018, the 38-year-old Cássio signed a one-year deal with Saudi Professional League club Al Taawoun FC as a replacement for Essam El Hadary, seven years his senior. The following 2 May, he was in goal as his side defeated Al-Ittihad Club in the final of the Kings Cup. On 22 July 2022, 

Cássio was released on 22 July 2022, despite having one year left in his contract.

Honours
Al Taawoun
Kings Cup: 2019

Individual
Saudi Professional League Goalkeeper of the Month: January 2021, February 2021

References

External links
CBF data 

Vasco official profile 

1980 births
Living people
Brazilian footballers
Footballers from Rio de Janeiro (city)
Association football goalkeepers
Campeonato Brasileiro Série A players
Campeonato Brasileiro Série C players
Olaria Atlético Clube players
Bangu Atlético Clube players
America Football Club (RJ) players
CR Vasco da Gama players
Macaé Esporte Futebol Clube players
Primeira Liga players
Campeonato de Portugal (league) players
F.C. Paços de Ferreira players
F.C. Arouca players
Rio Ave F.C. players
F.C. Felgueiras 1932 players
Saudi Professional League players
Al-Taawoun FC players
Brazilian expatriate footballers
Expatriate footballers in Portugal
Expatriate footballers in Saudi Arabia
Brazilian expatriate sportspeople in Portugal
Brazilian expatriate sportspeople in Saudi Arabia